The HillTopper Wind Farm is a 74-turbine wind farm near Mount Pulaski in southeastern Logan County in the U.S. state of Illinois. The turbines were designed to generate a maximum of 185 megawatts of electricity.  The complex was completed by Enel Green Power at a cost of approximately $325 million, and entered operations in 2018.

Detail
The HillTopper complex's 74 wind turbines are each rated at 2.5 mW. The project's overall 185-mW capacity was pre-sold to Bloomberg LP, Danone North America, General Motors, and Starbucks.  The complex utilizes leasehold rights to 7,500 acres of land.

References

Energy infrastructure completed in 2018
Wind farms in Illinois
Buildings and structures in Logan County, Illinois